"Come In, Stranger" is a 1958 Johnny Cash song. It was originally the B-side to "Guess Things Happen That Way", but the song gained greater popularity when Cash re-recorded it for the title track of an EP in 1971. The song was reissued again on Johnny Cash - The Essential Sun Singles.

References

1958 songs
Johnny Cash songs
Songs written by Johnny Cash